Sidbury is a civil parish in Shropshire, England.  It contains nine listed buildings that are recorded in the National Heritage List for England.  Of these, two are listed at Grade II*, the middle of the three grades, and the others are at Grade II, the lowest grade.  The parish is entirely rural, and the listed buildings consist of farmhouses, farm buildings and a church.


Key

Buildings

References

Citations

Sources

Lists of buildings and structures in Shropshire